Maeser is a census-designated place (CDP) in Uintah County, Utah, United States. The population was 2,855 at the 2000 census, a small increase over the 1990 figure of 2,598.  The village is named after Karl Maeser, an educator.

History 
Maeser was first settled in 1878. It became an incorporated municipality in 1935, but disincorporated on July 9, 1970.

Geography
According to the United States Census Bureau, the CDP has a total area of 6.5 square miles (16.8 km2), all land.

The community is west of U.S. Route 191 in the Ashley National Forest.

Demographics

As of the census of 2000, there were 2,855 people, 900 households, and 766 families residing in the CDP. The population density was 439.7 people per square mile (169.8/km2). There were 954 housing units at an average density of 146.9/sq mi (56.8/km2). The racial makeup of the CDP was 96.99% White, 0.07% African American, 1.02% Native American, 0.25% Asian, 1.09% from other races, and 0.60% from two or more races. Hispanic or Latino of any race were 2.35% of the population.

There were 900 households, out of which 46.3% had children under the age of 18 living with them, 76.6% were married couples living together, 5.8% had a female householder with no husband present, and 14.8% were non-families. 13.1% of all households were made up of individuals, and 6.4% had someone living alone who was 65 years of age or older. The average household size was 3.16 and the average family size was 3.48.

In the CDP, the population was spread out, with 36.3% under the age of 18, 7.1% from 18 to 24, 24.9% from 25 to 44, 21.4% from 45 to 64, and 10.4% who were 65 years of age or older. The median age was 32 years. For every 100 females, there were 97.2 males. For every 100 females age 18 and over, there were 98.3 males.

The median income for a household in the CDP was $40,779, and the median income for a family was $43,625. Males had a median income of $40,857 versus $25,100 for females. The per capita income for the CDP was $14,975. About 6.1% of families and 6.5% of the population were below the poverty line, including 6.4% of those under age 18 and 5.7% of those age 65 or over.

People of Note
 Earl W. Bascom (1906-1995), worked in the Old Gray coal mine of Maeser, cowboy artist, rodeo champion, inventor, hall of fame inductee, Hollywood actor

See also

 List of census-designated places in Utah

References

Census-designated places in Utah
Census-designated places in Uintah County, Utah
Populated places established in 1878
Former towns in Utah